William McGinnis may refer to:
 William McGinnis molecular biologist
 William McGinnis (rafter)
Will McGinnis of Audio Adrenaline